Târnava may refer to several entities in Romania:

 Târnava River
 Târnava, Sibiu, a commune in Sibiu County
 Târnava, a village in Radovan Commune, Dolj County
 Târnava, a village in Brănișca Commune, Hunedoara County
 Târnava, a village in Botoroaga Commune, Teleorman County

See also 
 Târnăvița (disambiguation)
 Târnova (disambiguation)
 Târnava Mare
 Târnava Mică